David Bing (born November 24, 1943) is an American former professional basketball player, businessman, and politician who served as the 74th mayor of Detroit, Michigan from 2009 to 2013. He is a member of the Democratic Party.

After starring at Syracuse University, Bing played 12 seasons in the National Basketball Association (NBA) as a point guard for the Detroit Pistons (1966–1975), Washington Bullets (1975–1977), and Boston Celtics (1977–78). During his career, he averaged over 20 points and six assists per game and made seven NBA All-Star Game appearances, winning the game's Most Valuable Player award in 1976. The Pistons celebrated his career accomplishments with the retirement of his #21 jersey. In addition, he was elected to the Naismith Memorial Basketball Hall of Fame and named to the NBA 50th Anniversary All-Time Team and the NBA 75th Anniversary All-Time Team.

Bing founded Bing Steel, a processing company that earned him the National Minority Small Business Person of the Year award in 1984. Soon the business grew into the multimillion-dollar Detroit-based conglomerate, the Bing Group, one of the largest steel companies in Michigan.

Bing entered Detroit politics as a Democrat in 2008, announcing his intentions to run for mayor in the city's non-partisan primary to finish the term of Kwame Kilpatrick, who had resigned amid a corruption scandal. After winning the primary, Bing then defeated Interim Mayor Kenneth Cockrel Jr. and was sworn in as mayor in May 2009. Later that year, Bing was re-elected to a full term. However, he lost most of his power to Detroit's emergency manager Kevyn Orr, had numerous health problems, and suffered approval ratings as low as 14%. Bing thus did not seek re-election in 2013 and was succeeded by politician and businessman Mike Duggan.

Early life 
Bing was born November 24, 1943, in Washington, D.C., to mother Juanita, a housekeeper, and father Hasker, a bricklayer and deacon for the local Baptist church. He was the second child of four living in a two-bedroom, one-story house in the northeast part of town. In his childhood, Bing received the nickname "Duke" from his father, because, according to Bing, he always "wanted to be top dog." He suffered a traumatic eye injury at age five, when, while playing with an improvised hobby horse he constructed with two sticks nailed together; Bing tripped and accidentally poked his left eye with a rusty nail. The family could not afford emergency surgery, leaving the eye to heal on its own and diminishing his vision thereafter.  Bing's father also suffered a severe head injury during the boy's childhood. While working a construction site, a brick fell four stories onto his head, causing a brain clot. The episode led young Bing to promise himself that he would never work in such a profession.

In athletics, Bing played basketball, but older children often told him he was too small for the game.  However, he played well, triumphing over such older and bigger children as future Motown musician Marvin Gaye, who, after not performing well on the court, chose to sing on the sidelines. Bing and Gaye forged a friendship, which continued later in life. Despite his basketball play, Bing, a fan of the Brooklyn Dodgers and Jackie Robinson, focused primarily on baseball, the neighborhood's preferred game.

Despite his fuzzy vision, he excelled in baseball at Spingarn High School, where he enrolled in 1958. Nevertheless, the school's head basketball coach William Roundtree encouraged him to revisit basketball. Roundtree became a fatherly figure to Bing, who decided to join the team. He developed into a double-digits per game scorer, noted for his jump shot and knack for driving to the basket. He continued also to compete in baseball into his senior year, but was forced to choose between it and basketball when a scheduling conflict between two tournaments arose. Though he felt he was better at baseball, Bing opted for basketball, believing it gave him a greater chance at a full-ride college scholarship, well aware of the path taken by Los Angeles Lakers forward Elgin Baylor, a Spingarn alum. At the tournament, Bing led his team to victory and earned MVP honors. All in all, in high school, Bing was a three-year letter winner, all–Inter High, all-Metro, and all-East member. In 1962, he was featured in Parade magazine and made the All-American Team.

College
Bing attended Syracuse University, where he was once roommates with Jim Boeheim. He led the Orangemen in scoring as a sophomore (22.2) in 1964, as a junior (23.2) in 1965, and as a senior (28.4) in 1966. During his senior year, Bing was fifth in the nation in scoring and was Syracuse's first consensus All-American in 39 years. He was also named to The Sporting News All-America First Team and was named Syracuse Athlete of the Year.

In his three-year varsity career at Syracuse, Bing averaged 24.8 points and 10.3 rebounds, with 1883 total points and 786 total rebounds in 76 games.

NBA career

Bing's playing style was somewhat unusual for the time.  As a lean, athletic and explosive point guard, he functioned as the playmaker distributing the ball, but also did more shooting and scoring than most others who had this position.  At one time a joke about him and his backcourt partner, Jimmy Walker, was that it was a shame they could only play the game with one ball at a time.

Detroit Pistons (1966–1975)
In 1966, after being selected 2nd overall in the 1966 NBA draft by the Detroit Pistons, Bing scored 1,601 points (20.0 points per game), and won the 1967 NBA Rookie of the Year Award while also being named to the NBA All-Rookie First Team. The next year, he led the NBA in scoring with 2,142 points (27.1 points per game) in 1968.

On November 23, 1968, Bing recorded a triple-double of 39 points, 16 rebounds and 10 assists in a 127–128 loss to the Baltimore Bullets.

Bing sat out 2½ months of the 1971–72 season due to a detached retina incurred from a preseason game against the Los Angeles Lakers, playing in only 45 games that season. While with the Pistons, he played in six NBA All-Star Games (1968, 1969, 1971, 1973–1975), and was named to the All-NBA First Team in 1968 and 1971.

Washington Bullets (1975–1977) 
After leaving the Detroit Pistons, Bing went on to spend his next two seasons with the Washington Bullets, for whom he was named an NBA All-Star once more in 1976, this time winning the game's MVP Award.

Boston Celtics (1977–1978) 
He played his final season with the Boston Celtics, averaging 13.6 points. He then retired at the conclusion of the 1977–1978 season.

Overall, in his NBA career, Bing averaged 20.3 points, 6.0 assists and 3.8 rebounds in 901 games over 12 NBA seasons, scoring 18,327 points with 5,397 assists.

Honors
Bing was awarded the J. Walter Kennedy Citizenship Award in 1977.

Bing was elected to the Naismith Memorial Basketball Hall of Fame in 1990.

Bing was named one of the 50 Greatest Players in NBA History in 1996.

Bing was inducted into the College Basketball Hall of Fame in 2006.

Bing was named one of the NBA 75th Anniversary Team in 2021.

Personal life
Bing is the godfather of Jalen Rose. In 2020, Bing published his autobiography titled 'Attacking the Rim'.

NBA career statistics

Regular season

Playoffs

Business career
At age 22 with an NBA contract worth $15,000, Bing was rebuffed by the National Bank of Detroit on getting a mortgage to finance a home. This led Bing to work at the bank during the offseason, holding jobs in the teller, customer relations, and mortgage departments.

Immediately after retiring, he worked at a warehouse of the steel processing company Paragon Steel and was paid $35,000. He left after two years, after stints in the company's shipping and sales operations.

Bing Steel
In 1980, Bing opened Bing Steel with four employees in a rented warehouse from $250,000 in loans and $80,000 of his own money. Losing all his money in six months, the company shied away from manufacturing to focus on being a middleman. With General Motors as their first major client, the company turned a profit in its second year on revenues of $4.2 million. By 1984, Bing was awarded by President Ronald Reagan the National Minority Small Business Person of the Year. By 1985, Bing Steel had expanded to two plants with 63 employees posting revenues of $40 million. Company assets were sold off in 2009.

The Bing Group
Bing Steel would transform itself to the Bing Group, a conglomerate with headquarters located in Detroit's North End. The company, among other things, supplies metal stampings to the automobile industry.

At the 1990 NBA All-Star Game, Bing received the Schick Achievement Award for his work after his NBA career.

Politics and activism
In January 2009, on Martin Luther King Jr. Day, Bing received the National Civil Rights Museum Sports Legacy Award. The award honors King's legacy as a leader of the civil rights movement, by acknowledging athletes who have made significant contributions to civil and human rights and who helped establish a foundation for future leaders in athletic careers.  The honor was to be presented during the half-time show of the game between the Memphis Grizzlies and the Detroit Pistons in Memphis, Tennessee.

Bing volunteered in the Big Brothers Big Sisters of America program.

Mayoral election
On October 16, 2008, Bing announced that he would be a candidate for the Mayor of Detroit in the 2009 Detroit mayoral special election. He finished first in a 15 candidate non-partisan primary on February 24, 2009. On May 5, 2009, the top two vote-getters faced off and he defeated interim Mayor Kenneth Cockrel, Jr. and was elected to complete former mayor Kwame Kilpatrick's term, which ended December 31, 2009. Kilpatrick had resigned as part of a plea bargain agreement after being charged with the crime of perjury.

Mayoralty and re-election
Bing was re-elected to a full term on November 3, 2009. He announced on May 14, 2013, he would not run for re-election. During his term as mayor of Detroit, the city became the largest city in U.S. history to declare bankruptcy.

References

Further reading

External links

 The Next Wave of Urban Reform, City Journal, Fall 2010
 Basketball Hall of Fame
 CityMayors profile
 
Bing on 'Cuse Conversations Podcast in 2020

1943 births
Living people
20th-century African-American sportspeople
21st-century African-American politicians
21st-century American politicians
African-American basketball players
African-American businesspeople
African-American mayors in Michigan
All-American college men's basketball players
American athlete-politicians
American men's basketball players
American steel industry businesspeople
Basketball players from Washington, D.C.
Boston Celtics players
Businesspeople from Washington, D.C.
Detroit Pistons announcers
Detroit Pistons draft picks
Detroit Pistons players
Maxwell School of Citizenship and Public Affairs alumni
Mayors of Detroit
Michigan Democrats
Naismith Memorial Basketball Hall of Fame inductees
National Basketball Association All-Stars
National Basketball Association broadcasters
National Basketball Association players with retired numbers
National Collegiate Basketball Hall of Fame inductees
Point guards
Syracuse Orange men's basketball players
Washington Bullets players